Wild West World was a Wild West theme park in Park City, Kansas that opened on May 5, 2007 and closed on July 9, 2007. It was located on  along Interstate 135 near Phil Ruffin's Wichita Greyhound Park, which closed the same year.

History
The park was owned, developed, and operated by Thomas and Cheryl Etheredge doing business as Wild West World, LLC and Restoration Farms, Inc.  They also owned the Prairie Rose Chuck Wagon entertainment venue in Butler County.

The announcement for the park appeared in the Wichita Eagle on December 19, 2004. Groundbreaking began on August 15, 2005. It was billed as the only all-western theme park in the world, and the first major one in Kansas. The claim to being the only all-western one is a mere technicality because Frontier City in Oklahoma City, has one non-western-themed ride (Mindbender) in an otherwise western-themed park.  According to the Hutchinson News the rides were off-the-shelf carnival attractions dressed up in a western facade.

Closure
On July 9, 2007, barely two months after the park opened, the owners filed for bankruptcy and closed it down. They cited lagging attendance and bad weather as the main factors for the decision, but experts also point to an inadequate business plan and a poor theming choice. They were also forced to close and sell the Prairie Rose Chuck Wagon. The park was for sale, and the owners publicly stated that they hoped to reopen it in the future.  However, no sale materialized. The fixtures, equipment, and materials were auctioned by Bud Palmer Auctions.  A few empty buildings are all that remain, but all remaining structures and landscaping were auctioned off on November 6, 2010 so that the site could be bulldozed and prepared for future development.

Securities fraud
On April 19, 2009, Thomas Etheredge was arrested on 10 counts of securities fraud related to investments in the park totaling $800,000, much of which was raised from the members of Wichita's Summit Church. The Summit Church split from Immanuel Baptist Church, where Etheredge had also been a member, when pastor Terry Fox resigned, and the new church congregated in the Johnny Western Theater on the park grounds during construction. After the park filed bankruptcy, it was learned that Etheredge had previously served three years in prison for securities fraud in another investment scheme. He was convicted on February 10, 2010 on 7 counts of securities fraud. He was sentenced on April 2 to five years in prison, and paroled on July 29, 2013.

See also
 List of defunct amusement parks
 Joyland Amusement Park
 Wonderland Park

References

External links
 

 Wichita Eagle coverage of the Wild West World bankruptcy
 Bud Palmer Auctions Web site (Bankruptcy auctioneer)

Amusement parks in Kansas
Buildings and structures completed in 2007
Buildings and structures in Sedgwick County, Kansas
Defunct amusement parks in the United States
Western (genre) theme parks
2007 establishments in Kansas
2007 disestablishments in Kansas
Amusement parks opened in 2007
Amusement parks closed in 2007